Yusuf Garaad Omar (born 26 June 1960 in Mogadishu) is a Somali journalist, diplomat and politician. He previously served as Somalia ambassador to the United Nations and was a senior advisor to President Hassan Sheikh Mohamud. He was the Somali Minister of Foreign Affairs from March 2017 until he was fired by then Prime Minister Hassan Ali Khaire in January 2018.

Early life and education 
Omar was born on 26 June 1960 in the Hamar Jajab district of Mogadishu, Somalia. He attended high school in the capital. Omar later studied French at the Somali National University, where he earned a Bachelor of Arts in linguistics. In 1990, he moved to Italy and pursued an advanced degree in anthropology at the University of Siena. He later on attended the Global Master of Arts Program at The Fletcher School of Law and Diplomacy at Tufts University in Massachusetts, USA. He is also multilingual, speaking Somali, Italian, French and English.

Career

Journalism and politics 
In a professional capacity, Omar has worked as a professional journalist for many years. He initially was a correspondent with Radio Mogadishu from 1984 until the outbreak of the civil war in Somalia in 1991. Omar thereafter served as a freelance reporter in Italy. He later joined the BBC Somali Service in 1992, eventually becoming the chairman of the department eight years later.

In 2012, Yusuf left from his position at the BBC to run for political office in Somalia. He subsequently presented himself as one of the potential candidates in the country's 2012 presidential elections.

in 2013 he served as a senior Adviser to the President of Somalia. He was also assigned to a number of key tasks including negotiations with the Breakaway Somali Region of Somaliland aimed at safeguarding the territorial integrity and the unity of Somalia.

Minister of Foreign Affairs of Somalia 
On 21 March 2017, Omar was appointed Minister of Foreign Affairs of Somalia by then Prime Minister Hassan Ali Khaire. He succeeded Abdusalam H. Omer at the position. On 29 March 2017, Omar formally assumed office after sworn in.

See also 
 Abdusalam H. Omer
 Abdirahman Duale Beyle
 List of foreign ministers in 2017
 List of current foreign ministers

References

External links 

 

1960 births
21st-century Somalian politicians
Ethnic Somali people
Foreign Ministers of Somalia
Living people
Somali National University alumni
Somalian journalists
University of Siena alumni